NGC 560 is a lenticular galaxy in the constellation Cetus. It is estimated to be about 250 million light-years from the Milky Way and has a diameter of approximately 150,000 light years. It is part of the Abell 194 galaxy cluster. NGC 560 was discovered on October 1, 1785 by the German-British astronomer William Herschel.

See also 
 List of NGC objects (1–1000)

References

External links 
 

560
Lenticular galaxies
Cetus (constellation)
Discoveries by William Herschel
005430